The Western Sahara Autonomy Proposal is an initiative proposed by Morocco in 2006 as a possible solution to the Western Sahara conflict. In 2006, the Moroccan Royal Advisory Council for Saharan Affairs (CORCAS) proposed a plan for the autonomy of Western Sahara and made visits to a number of countries to explain the proposal. The Spanish approach to regional autonomy has been named as a possible model for Western Saharan autonomy, mentioning specifically the cases of the Canary Islands, the Basque Country, Andalusia or Catalonia. The plan was presented to the UN Security Council in April 2007 and received the backing of the United States and France.  This initiative constituted the main ground for the Moroccan proposal at Manhasset negotiations.

The proposal was following the two failed proposals of Baker Plan, which insisted on an independence referendum for Western Sahara after five years of autonomy; the plan was rejected by Morocco. A proposal was also published by Polisario to the UN on 10 April 2007, a day before the Moroccan proposal. The UN Security Council unanimously voted for Resolution 1754 on 30 April 2007 calling for talks of both parties, appreciating the proposal of Morocco and taking note of Polisario's proposal. Based on the proposal, there were four UN-sponsored peace talks between delegations of Polisario and Morocco on 18–19 June 2007, 10–11 August 2007, 7–9 January 2008 and 18–19 March 2008, all of which were held in Manhasset, New York.

Background
The portions of Western Sahara was a Spanish Colony until 1975 as the last colonial province in Africa. A war erupted between those countries and the Sahrawi national liberation movement, the Polisario Front, which proclaimed the Sahrawi Arab Democratic Republic (SADR) with a government in exile in Tindouf, Algeria. Mauritania withdrew in 1979, and Morocco eventually secured control of most of the territory, including all the major cities and natural resources. Polisario was formed in 1973 to fight for the rights of Sahawari Arab African People. Polisario attacked Moroccan positions many times and have retaliated. Continued war was waged between Polisario and Morocco over prominence in the region backed by Algeria for Polisario and US, France and Saudi Arabia for Morocco.

Interim wars
Morocco started building a massive wall to reduce the attacks and military activity. During November to December 1987, a United Nations peace mission arrived to assess the military and political impact of the wall. They sought a face-to-face meeting with Polisario and Morocco to arrive at a ceasefire and initiate proceedings for a referendum. They had different meetings with Morocco, Algeria and Polisario and proposed a resolution which was passed unopposed. During the time, Algeria, which had been a long-time ally of Polisario, held secret meetings with Morocco at the foreign ministry level. By May 1988, both countries announced that diplomatic relations between the countries would be restored. During July 1988, Moroccan King Hassan expressed his support for a referendum, but declined to name Western Sahara an independent state, but a special administrative region. He also denied meeting with Polisario. In spite of the UN's continued effort, the denial introduced criticism of Morocco's positions by Polisario. King Hassan agreed to meet representatives from SADR. During 1989, Algeria claimed that it would continue to support SADR amidst growing concern of Algeria breaking links with SADR. King Hassan's elongated delay frustrated SADR and they started an attack. During the first week of October 1989, Polisario started attacks on Moroccan positions in Guelta-Zemmour, which forced Moroccan troops 25 kilometers inside the defensive wall. The group also claimed that they secured the 1st Light Security Group of the 4th and 5th Rapid Intervention Force of Morocco. They also attacked Moroccan positions in the North towards Hauza on October 11. Following the attacks King Hassan called off the second meeting with SADR representatives.

Baker Plan
The fighting continued till 1 September 1991 when a UN mission brokered peace a ceasefire in the region. There have been various proposals by both the parties in the United Nations. James Baker, an American diplomat in the region worked out a couple of settlement plans, called Baker Plan after 1997. In the first plan, he proposed autonomy to the region with foreign affairs and defense managed by Morocco. The plan was rejected by Polisario and Algeria indicating that any proposal without independence could not be accepted. They also argued that the count of natives should be based on the census of 1975 and not based on migrants from Morocco in the interim period. The second proposal called for a referendum after five years of autonomy. The plan was accepted by Morocco initially, but later rejected quoting that any plan with proposal of independence could not be accepted. The plan was rejected by Morocco and Baker left the position in 2004.

Proposal
Moroccan backed advisory council on Western Sahara (CORCAS)  submitted a proposal to the United Nations during April 2006 that would grant autonomy to the people of Western Sahara. As per the plan, the Sahawaris would run their government under Moroccan sovereignty. It also indicated that Morocco will control defense and foreign affairs. The Moroccan authorities indicated that the failure of the proposal would increase Islamic fundamental ideas and terrorism in the region around Sahel. Hamid Chabar, the Moroccan representative of the United Nations Mission for the Referendum in Western Sahara quoted that "There are a lot of young people in the Sahel who are leaning towards radical Islam, with groups such as the Salafist Group for Preaching and Combat gaining ground". The claims were denied by Polisario which stated that it never supported terrorism. The autonomy proposal was rejected by the front in February 2004 soon it was proposed, while Morocco sought the backing of the United States to take it forward. A proposal was also published by Polisario to the UN on 10 April 2007, a day before the Moroccan proposal. The UN Security unanimously voted for the Resolution 1754 on 30 April 2007, calling for talks of both parties, appreciating the proposal of Morocco and taking note of Polisario's proposal. Based on the proposal, there were four UN sponsored peace talks between delegation of Polisario and Morocco 18–19 June 2007, 10–11 August 2007, 7–9 January 2008 and 7–9 January 2008, all of which were held in New York City.

In a 2007 letter to President George W. Bush, 173 members of US congress endorsed the plan. In a letter to President Obama in 2009, 233 US congressmen endorsed the plan. In 2010, a letter to Secretary of State Clinton backing the Moroccan plan for autonomy, was signed by 54 Senators.

2022
On 19 March 2022 the Spanish and Moroccan press suggested the president of the Spanish Government had provisionally accepted this proposal, although parliamentary ratification was not assured

International support

See also
Regional autonomy
Baker Plan
Western Sahara

References

External links
 UN secretary general's special envoy on autonomy for Western Sahara

Politics of Western Sahara
Politics of Morocco
Western Sahara peace process